Viburnum propinquum, the Chinese evergreen viburnum, is a species of flowering plant in the family Viburnaceae, native to central and southern China, Taiwan, and Luzon in the Philippines. A dense, rounded evergreen bush reaching , and useful for landscaping applications, it is hardy to USDA zone 7.

References

propinquum
Flora of North-Central China
Flora of South-Central China
Flora of Southeast China
Flora of Taiwan
Flora of the Philippines
Plants described in 1888